In graph theory, the Stoer–Wagner algorithm is a recursive algorithm to solve the minimum cut problem in undirected weighted graphs with non-negative weights. It was proposed by Mechthild Stoer and Frank Wagner in 1995. The essential idea of this algorithm is to shrink the graph by merging the most intensive vertices, until the graph only contains two combined vertex sets. At each phase, the algorithm finds the minimum - cut for two vertices  and  chosen at its will. The minimum cut found in all phases will be the minimum weighted cut of the graph.

A cut is a partition of the vertices of a graph into two non-empty, disjoint subsets. A minimum cut is a cut for which the size or weight of the cut is not larger than the size of any other cut. For an unweighted graph, the minimum cut would simply be the cut with the least edges. For a weighted graph, the sum of all edges' weight on the cut determines whether it is a minimum cut. In practice, the minimum cut problem is always discussed with the maximum flow problem, to explore the maximum capacity of a network, since the minimum cut is a bottleneck in a graph or network.

Stoer–Wagner minimum cut algorithm 
Let  be a weighted undirected graph. Suppose that .

The algorithm is described as:
 MinimumCutPhase
     
     while 
         add to  the most tightly connected vertex
     end
     store the cut in which the last remaining vertex is by itself (the "cut-of-the-phase") 
     shrink  by merging the two vertices (s, t) added last (the value of "cut-of-the-phase" is the value of minimum s, t cut.)
 
 MinimumCut
     while 
         MinimumCutPhase
         if the cut-of-the-phase is lighter than the current minimum cut
             then store the cut-of-the-phase as the current minimum cut
The algorithm works in phases. After one phase of the MinimumCutPhase, the two vertices are merged as a new vertex, and edges from the two vertices to a remaining vertex are replaced by an edge weighted by the sum of the weights of the previous two edges. Edges joining the merged nodes are removed. Therefore, the algorithm would merge them as one node. In addition, the MinimumCut would record and update the global minimum cut after each MinimumCutPhase. After  phases, the minimum cut can be determined.

Example 
This section refers to Figs. 1–6 in the original paper

The graph in step 1 shows the original graph  and randomly selects node 2 as the starting node for this algorithm. In the MinimumCutPhase, set  only has node 2, the heaviest edge is edge (2,3), so node 3 is added into set . Next, set  contains node 2 and node 3, the heaviest edge is (3,4), thus node 4 is added to set . By merging them, the new graph is as shown in step 2. In this phase, the weight of cut is 5, which is the summation of edges (1,2) and (1,5). Right now, the first loop of MinimumCut is completed.

In step 2, starting from node 2, the heaviest edge is (2,15), thus node 15 is put in set . The next heaviest edges is (2,3) or (15,6), we choose (15,6) thus node 6 is added to the set. Then we compare edge (2,3) and (6,7) and choose node 3 to put in set . The last two nodes are node 7 and node 8. Therefore, merge edge (7,8). The minimum cut is 5, so remain the minimum as 5.

The following steps repeat the same operations on the merged graph, until there is only one edge in the graph, as shown in step 7. The global minimum cut has edge (2,3) and edge (6,7), which is detected in step 5.

Proof of correctness 
To prove the correctness of this algorithm, we need to prove that the cut given by MinimumCutPhase is in fact a minimum  cut of the graph, where s and t are the two vertices last added in the phase. Therefore, a lemma is shown below:Lemma 1: MinimumCutPhase returns a minimum -cut of .Let  be an arbitrary  cut, and  be the cut given by the phase. We must show that . We say the vertex  is active if  and the vertex added just before  are
in opposite sides of the cut. We prove the lemma by induction on the set of active vertices. We prove, for each active vertex ,Let  be the first active vertex.

Time complexity 
The running time of the algorithm MinimumCut is equal to the added running time of the  runs of MinimumCutPhase, which is called on graphs with decreasing number of vertices and edges.

For the MinimumCutPhase, a single run of it needs at most  time.

For the further improvement, the key is to make it easy to select the next vertex to be added to the set , the most tightly connected vertex. During execution of a phase, all vertices that are not in  reside in a priority queue based on a key field. The key of a vertex  is the sum of the weights of the edges connecting it to the current , that is, . As this is done exactly once for every edge, overall we have to perform  ExtractMax and  IncreaseKey operations. By using the Fibonacci heap we can perform an ExtractMax operation in  amortized time and an IncreaseKey operation in  amortized time.

Example code 
Below is a concise c++ implementation of the Stoer–Wagner algorithm.
// Adjacency matrix implementation of Stoer–Wagner min cut algorithm.
//
// Running time:
//     O(|V|^3)

#include <bits/stdc++.h>
using namespace std;

pair<int, vector<int>> globalMinCut(vector<vector<int>> mat) {
    pair<int, vector<int>> best = {INT_MAX, {}};
    int n = mat.size();
    vector<vector<int>> co(n);
    for (int i = 0; i < n; i++) co[i] = {i};
    for (int ph = 1; ph < n; ph++) {
        vector<int> w = mat[0];
        size_t s = 0, t = 0;
        for (int it = 0; it < n - ph; it++) { // O(V^2) -> O(E log V) with prio. queue
            w[t] = INT_MIN;
            s = t, t = max_element(w.begin(), w.end()) - w.begin();
            for (int i = 0; i < n; i++) w[i] += mat[t][i];
        }
        best = min(best, {w[t] - mat[t][t], co[t]});
        co[s].insert(co[s].end(), co[t].begin(), co[t].end());
        for (int i = 0; i < n; i++) mat[s][i] += mat[t][i];
        for (int i = 0; i < n; i++) mat[i][s] = mat[s][i];
        mat[0][t] = INT_MIN;
    }
    return best;
}

const int maxn = 550;  
const int inf = 1000000000;  
int n, r;  
int edge[maxn][maxn], dist[maxn];  
bool vis[maxn], bin[maxn];  
void init()  
{  
    memset(edge, 0, sizeof(edge));  
    memset(bin, false, sizeof(bin));  
}  
int contract( int &s, int &t )          // Find s,t  
{  
    memset(dist, 0, sizeof(dist));  
    memset(vis, false, sizeof(vis));  
    int i, j, k, mincut, maxc;  
    for (i = 1; i <= n; i++)  
    {  
        k = -1; maxc = -1;  
        for (j = 1; j <= n; j++)if (!bin[j] && !vis[j] && dist[j] > maxc)  
        {  
            k = j;  maxc = dist[j];  
        }  
        if (k == -1) return mincut;  
        s = t;  t = k;  
        mincut = maxc;  
        vis[k] = true;  
        for (j = 1; j <= n; j++) if (!bin[j] && !vis[j])  
            dist[j] += edge[k][j];  
    }  
    return mincut;  
}

int Stoer_Wagner()  
{  
    int mincut, i, j, s, t, ans;  
    for (mincut = inf, i = 1; i < n; i++)  
    {  
        ans = contract( s, t );  
        bin[t] = true;  
        if (mincut > ans) mincut = ans;  
        if (mincut == 0) return 0;  
        for (j = 1; j <= n; j++) if (!bin[j])  
            edge[s][j] = (edge[j][s] += edge[j][t]);  
    }  
    return mincut;  
}

References

External links
 StoerWagnerMinCut.java - a Java library that implements the Stoer–Wagner algorithm

Graph algorithms
Graph connectivity